Glenwood Park is a mixed-use neighborhood on the east side of Atlanta, Georgia, United States, located just west of North Ormewood Park. The neighborhood is an example of New Urbanism, promoting a sense of community with walkable streets and closely spaced residential units that are mixed in with office, retail, and green space. Glenwood Park is on the BeltLine, a former rail line converted to a trail.

References

External links 
 GlenwoodPark.com

New Urbanism communities
Mixed-use developments in Georgia (U.S. state)